This list of tallest buildings in Incheon ranks skyscrapers in the South Korean city of Incheon by height.

Tallest buildings 
Only buildings over 150m (as determined by the Council on Tall Buildings and Urban Habitat) are included.

Tallest buildings under construction 
This lists buildings that are under construction in Incheon and are planned to rise at least . Buildings that have been topped out but are not completed are also included.

Incheon
Buildings and structures in Incheon